This is a table of seat belt use rates (percent) in various countries worldwide.

Seat belt use rates metrics might be part of some safety process.

See also
 Seat belt legislation
 Seat belt use rates in the United States

References

International rankings
Automotive safety
Seat belts